Dressed to Kill is a 1980 American erotic psychological horror-thriller film written and directed by Brian De Palma, and starring Michael Caine, Angie Dickinson, Nancy Allen, and Keith Gordon. It depicts the events leading up to the brutal murder of a New York City housewife (Dickinson) before following a prostitute (Allen) who witnesses the crime, and her attempts to solve it with the help of the victim's son (Gordon). It contains several direct references to Alfred Hitchcock's 1960 film Psycho.

Released in July 1980, Dressed to Kill was a box office success in the United States, grossing over $30 million. It received largely favorable reviews, and critic David Denby of New York magazine proclaimed it "the first great American movie of the '80s". Despite its critical acclaim, the film was met with disapproval by several feminist organizations in the United States, who criticized its representations of transgenderism and violence against women. Dickinson won the Saturn Award for Best Actress for her performance. Allen received both a Golden Globe Award nomination for New Star of the Year, as well as an inaugural first-year Golden Raspberry Award for Worst Actress.

Plot
Sexually frustrated housewife Kate Miller is attending therapy sessions with New York City psychiatrist Dr. Robert Elliott. During an appointment, Kate attempts to seduce him, but Elliott rejects her advances, stating his unwillingness to jeopardize his happy marriage. Kate has planned to spend the day with her teenaged son Peter, an inventor, but he has to cancel as he has reached a critical point in his research, for his entry to the city's science fair. Thus, Kate goes alone to the Metropolitan Museum of Art where she unexpectedly flirts with a mysterious stranger. Kate and the stranger stalk each other through the museum until they finally wind up outside, where Kate joins him in a taxi. They go to his apartment and have sex.

Hours later, Kate awakens and decides to discreetly leave while the man, Warren Lockman, is asleep. Kate sits at his desk to leave him a note and finds a document indicating that Warren has contracted both syphilis and gonorrhea. Shocked, she leaves the apartment, but having hastily forgotten her wedding ring on the nightstand, she returns to retrieve it. The elevator doors open on the figure of a tall, blonde woman in dark sunglasses wielding a straight razor, who violently slashes Kate to death in the elevator. Upon discovering the body, Liz Blake, a high-priced call girl, notices the killer in the elevator's convex mirror, and subsequently becomes both the prime suspect and the killer's next target.

Dr. Elliott receives a bizarre message on his answering machine from "Bobbi", a transgender patient. Bobbi taunts the psychiatrist for ending their therapy sessions, apparently because Elliott refuses to sign the necessary papers for Bobbi to get sex reassignment surgery. Elliott tries to convince Dr. Levy, the patient's new doctor, that Bobbi is endangering herself and others.

Police Detective Marino doubts Liz's story, partly because of her profession, so Liz partners with a revenge-minded Peter to find the killer, using a series of his homemade listening devices and time-lapse cameras to track patients leaving Elliott's office. They catch Bobbi on camera, and soon a tall blonde in sunglasses starts stalking Liz, subsequently making several attempts on her life. Peter thwarts one of them in the New York City Subway by spraying Bobbi with homemade Mace.

The pair scheme to learn Bobbi's birth name by infiltrating Dr. Elliott's office. Liz baits the therapist by stripping to lingerie and flirting with him, distracting him long enough to briefly exit and look through his appointment book. Peter is watching through the window when a blonde pulls him away. When Liz returns, a razor-wielding blonde confronts her; the blonde outside shoots and wounds the blonde inside, knocking the wig off and revealing the razor-wielding blonde as Dr. Elliott/Bobbi. The blonde who shot Bobbi is actually a female police officer, revealing herself to be the blonde who has been trailing Liz.

Elliott is arrested and  committed to a mental institution. Dr. Levy explains later to Liz that Elliott wanted to be a woman, but his male side would not allow him to proceed with the operation. Whenever a woman sexually aroused Elliott, Bobbi, representing the unstable, female side of the doctor's personality, became threatened to the point that she finally became murderous. When Dr. Levy realized this through his last conversation with Elliott, he called the police, who went to work and eventually apprehended Elliott.

In a final sequence, Elliott escapes from the asylum after strangling a nurse, stalks Liz to Peter's house, and slashes her throat. She wakes up screaming and Peter rushes to her side, letting her realize it was just a nightmare.

Cast

Production

Casting 
De Palma originally wanted Norwegian actress Liv Ullmann to play Kate Miller, but she declined because of the violence, and the role then went to Angie Dickinson. Sean Connery was offered the role of Robert Elliott and was enthusiastic about it, but declined because of previous commitments. Connery later worked with De Palma on the 1987 Oscar-winning adaptation of The Untouchables.

Filming 

Dressed to Kill was shot primarily in New York City, though the art gallery scene was filmed at the Philadelphia Museum of Art.

The naked body in the opening scene, taking place in a shower, was not that of Angie Dickinson, but of 1977 Penthouse Pet of the Year model Victoria Lynn Johnson. De Palma has referred to the elevator killing as the best murder scene he has ever done.

Censorship 
Two versions of the film exist in North America, an R-rated version and an unrated version. The unrated version is around 30 seconds longer and shows more pubic hair in the shower scene, more blood in the elevator scene (including a close-up shot of the killer slitting Kate's throat), and more explicit dialogue from Liz during the scene in Elliott's office. These scenes were trimmed when the MPAA originally gave the film an X rating.

Release

Box office
Dressed to Kill premiered in Los Angeles and New York City on July 25, 1980. The film grossed $3,416,000 in its opening weekend from 591 theatres and improved its gross the following weekend with $3,640,000 from 596 theatres. It grossed a total of $31.9 million at the U.S. box office, and was the 21st highest-grossing film of the year.

Critical response
Dressed to Kill holds a 82% "fresh" rating on Rotten Tomatoes based on 55 reviews, with an average rating of 6.70/10. The consensus states, "With arresting visuals and an engrossingly lurid mystery, Dressed to Kill stylishly encapsulates writer-director Brian De Palma's signature strengths." On Metacritic, the film has a score of 74 out of 100 based on 16 reviews, indicating "generally favorable reviews".

Roger Ebert of the Chicago Sun-Times awarded the film three stars out of four, stating "the museum sequence is brilliant" and adding: "Dressed to Kill is an exercise in style, not narrative; it would rather look and feel like a thriller than make sense, but DePalma has so much fun with the conventions of the thriller that we forgive him and go along." Gene Siskel of the Chicago Tribune also gave it three stars out of four, writing that there were scenes "that are as exciting and as stylish as any ever put on film. Unfortunately, a good chunk of the film is a whodunit, and its mystery is so easy to solve that we merely end up watching the film's visual pyrotechnics at a distance, never getting all that involved." Vincent Canby of The New York Times called the film "witty, romantic," and "very funny, which helps to defuse the effect of the graphically photographed violence. In addition, the film is, in its own inside-out way, peculiarly moral." His review added that "The performers are excellent, especially Miss Dickinson." Variety declared "Despite some major structural weaknesses, the cannily manipulated combination of mystery, gore and kinky sex adds up to a slick commercial package that stands to draw some rich blood money." David Denby of New York magazine proclaimed the film "the first great American movie of the '80s."

Sheila Benson of the Los Angeles Times wrote "The brilliance of Dressed to Kill is apparent within seconds of its opening gliding shot; it is a sustained work of terror—elegant, sensual, erotic, bloody, a directorial tour de force." Pauline Kael of The New Yorker stated of De Palma that "his timing is so great that when he wants you to feel something he gets you every time. His thriller technique, constantly refined, has become insidious, jewelled. It's hardly possible to find a point at which you could tear yourself away from this picture." Gary Arnold of The Washington Post wrote, "This elegant new murder thriller promises to revive the lagging summer box office and enhance De Palma's reputation as the most exciting and distinctive manipulator of suspense since Alfred Hitchcock." In his movie guide, Leonard Maltin gave the film  stars out of four, calling it a "High-tension melodrama", and stating "De Palma works on viewers' emotions, not logic, and maintains a fever pitch from start to finish." He also praised Pino Donaggio's "chilling music score."

John Simon, of the National Review, after taking note of the two-page advertisements full of superlatives in The New York Times, wrote "What Dressed to Kill dispenses liberally, however, is sophomoric soft-core pornography, vulgar manipulation of the emotions for mere sensation, salacious but inept dialogue that is a cross between comic-strip Freudianism and sniggering double entendres, and a plot line so full of holes to be at best a dotted line".

Controversy
The film led to controversy and protests upon its release. When the film was screened, Iowa City National Organization for Women and members of other feminist organizations picketed the film as it was shown on the University of Iowa campus, distributing leaflets against the film, condemning what they saw as a depiction of violence against women as entertainment. During the film's initial release, the activist group Women Against Violence in Pornography and Media distributed a leaflet, arguing that "The distorted image of a psychotic male transvestite [sic] makes all sexual minorities appear sick and dangerous.” Numerous critics have since placed Dressed to Kill in a lineage of slasher movies that perpetuate the transphobic myth that trans people are mentally ill sexual predators. Dressed to Kill was featured in the 2020 documentary Disclosure: Trans Lives on Screen; in a 2020 reappraisal of the film for The Guardian, the critic Scott Tobias referred to De Palma's understanding of trans issues as "disconcertingly retrograde....There's no getting around the ugly association of gender transition with violence, other than to say that it feels thoroughly aestheticized".

In a 2016 interview, De Palma said, "I don't know what the transgender community would think [of the film now]... Obviously I realize that it's not good for their image to be transgender and also be a psychopathic murderer. But I think that [perception] passes with time. We're in a different time." He added that he was "glad" that the film had become "a favorite of the gay community," which he attributed to its "flamboyance".

Home media
, the film is owned by Metro-Goldwyn-Mayer (successor to Orion Pictures, who bought Filmways and American International Pictures in 1982). The film saw a 1984 VHS release by Warner Home Video, and later another VHS release by Goodtimes under licence from Orion. In 2001, MGM released the film in a special edition DVD. In September 2011, MGM released both R-rated and unrated versions on DVD and Blu-ray.

The Criterion Collection released separate deluxe Blu-ray and DVD editions of the film on September 8, 2015. On October 25, 2022, Kino Lorber issued the film for the first time in 4K UHD Blu-ray format.

Accolades

See also
 List of horror films of 1980
 List of American films of 1980
 Transgender in film and television
Cruising-William Friedkin's cult 1980 film with similar LGBT themes
 Giallo

References

Bibliography

External links

 
 
 
 
 
 
 Film stills
 Dressed to Kill: The Power of Two – an essay by Michael Koresky at The Criterion Collection

1980 films
1980 crime films
1980 independent films
1980 LGBT-related films
1980 thriller films
1980s crime thriller films
1980s English-language films
1980s erotic thriller films
1980s mystery thriller films
1980s slasher films
American crime thriller films
American erotic horror films
American erotic thriller films
American horror thriller films
American independent films
American LGBT-related films
American neo-noir films
American mystery thriller films
American slasher films
Erotic mystery films
Erotic slasher films
Film controversies
Filmways films
Films about adultery in the United States
Films about dissociative identity disorder
Films about murderers
Films about prostitution in the United States
Films about psychiatry
Films about trans women
Films directed by Brian De Palma
Films scored by Pino Donaggio
Films set in museums
Films set in New York City
Films shot in New York City
Films shot in Philadelphia
LGBT-related controversies in film
LGBT-related thriller films
Rating controversies in film
1980s American films